Jewish Sports Review (JSR) is a bi-monthly magazine that was established in 1997.  Its editors are Ephraim Moxson and Shel Wallman.

The magazine identifies which star and professional athletes are Jewish.  It also covers and has all-time lists for Jewish players in major professional sports, college teams, athletes in international competition, and selected high school athletes.

Jewish Sports Review ceased publication on September 16, 2022.

As to his inspiration for launching the magazine, Wallman—speaking on a panel on Jews in baseball at the Cooperstown Baseball Hall of Fame—said: "I was always curious to know who was Jewish as a kid. And there wasn't a list."

Identification and verification
JSR provides information as to who is Jewish in the sports world, verifying the Jewish background of every athlete covered. JSR'''s criteria are that an athlete is Jewish if at least one parent is Jewish, he did not practice any other religion during his athletic career, and he self-identifies as ethnically Jewish.  If an athlete has a Jewish parent but was raised in, or converted to, another faith, or indicated to JSR that he did not wish to be considered Jewish, he is excluded (even though under Jewish law he might be considered Jewish).  Moxson indicates that David Beckham is not included, as only his mother's father is Jewish, and he does not identify himself as Jewish.JSR researches whether or not an athlete is Jewish. In some instances, an athlete self-identifies as Jewish in an interview to a reliable news source. In other instances, the researchers contact an athlete because his surname is one that is often Jewish, or because a relative has asked for the person to be included. The athlete is asked whether or not they wish to be identified as Jewish before they are included in the Review.

Some athletes are not "obviously" Jewish, such as former major league baseball player, Rubén Amaro, Jr. JSR also lists athletes frequently misidentified as Jewish, among them second baseman  Rod Carew ("never converted, although his children were raised Jewish"), pitcher Mike LaCoss ("born Marks, but took his stepfather's name and becomes irate when he is categorized as a Jew"), and quarterback Rex Grossman (who is German-Catholic).

Baseball

In 2009, as Jewish baseball players Ryan Braun, Ian Kinsler, and Kevin Youkilis were leading in voting for their positions on their All Star teams, JSR noted that 160 Jews had played in the major leagues.

The New York Daily News reported that according to JSR, there were almost three dozen Jews in baseball before Hank Greenberg, but unlike Greenberg many had changed their names as they played in the majors.  Michael Silverman changed his name to Baker, Rosenblum to Bennett, Lifsit to Bostwick, Solomon to Reese, and Makowsky to Markel.  And Bohne, Cooney, Ewing, Kane, and Corey were all Cohens in the off-season.

When the American Jewish Historical Society published a set of baseball cards of Jews in the major leagues, the project founder, Martin Abramowitz of Jewish Major Leaguers Inc., relied on research by JSR.  Also, when the Israel Baseball League was active, teams in it would recruit top college baseball players from the JSR's Jewish All-Americans in NCAA Divisions I, II, and III.

Basketball

Jon Scheyer, later an All-American captain of the 2010 Duke national championship team, led his high school team of five Jewish starters to an Illinois state championship.  Afterward, The Forward quoted Wallman as speculating that an all-Jewish starting lineup may have won a state title in the 1940s, but that it had not happened in the recent past.

In the media
Peter Horvitz, in The Big Book of Jewish Sports Heroes: An Illustrated Compendium of Sports History and The 150 Greatest Jewish Sports Stars (2007), calls Wallman the "best and most dependable source of up-to-date information on the subject" of Jews in sports.  Joseph Siegman, in his book Jewish Sports Legends: the International Jewish Hall of Fame (2005), listed Moxson as a distinguished authority on sports.  The New York Times noted that JSR "aims to be rigorously comprehensive".  Sports Illustrated called JSR "tireless in its service mission".JSR has been featured in Sports Illustrated, The New York Times, Los Angeles Times and Baltimore Sun''.

See also
List of Jews in sports

References

External links
Jewish Sports Review

Sports magazines published in the United States
Jewish sports
Jewish magazines published in the United States
Magazines published in Los Angeles
Biweekly magazines published in the United States
Magazines established in 1997
Bimonthly magazines published in the United States